The 2021–22 season is the 7th season of Sudeva Delhi Football Club in existence and 2nd season in I-League.

Team

First-team squad

Transfers

Transfers In

Transfers Out

Technical staff

Overview

I-League

League table

League Results by round

Durand Cup

Group B

Matches

Statistics

Goalscorers

Notes

References

Sudeva Delhi FC seasons